IBC News 5:30 Report was an afternoon newscast of the IBC 13 from March 9, 1992 (then when it was still branded as Islands TV-13) to July 7, 1995, replacing Headline Trese and was replaced by IBC TV X-Press.

Anchors
Vince Alingod
Lee Andres
Karen Bayhon

See also
List of programs previously broadcast by Intercontinental Broadcasting Corporation
IBC News and Public Affairs

Intercontinental Broadcasting Corporation news shows
IBC News and Public Affairs	
Intercontinental Broadcasting Corporation original programming	
1990s Philippine television series
1992 Philippine television series debuts
1995 Philippine television series endings
Filipino-language television shows
Philippine television news shows